Lantin Singho is a 2015 Sri Lankan Sinhala comedy film directed by Aruna Mahendra and produced by Hashani Perera for Hashani Film Arts. It stars Ananda Wickramage, Wimal Kumara de Costa and Kumara Thirimadura in lead roles along with Dilhani Ekanayake and Sanoja Bibile. Music composed by Sarath Wickrama. It is the 1236th Sri Lankan film in the Sinhala cinema. This is the last film played by veteran comedian Wimal Kumara de Costa, before his death.

Plot

Cast
 Ananda Wickramage as Dudley Mithurusinghe / doppelgänger mad man
 Wimal Kumara de Costa as Sebastian
 Kumara Thirimadura as Molwatte Wimale
 Dilhani Ekanayake as Samadara
 Sanoja Bibile as Pilomina
 Duleeka Marapana as Nurse
 Giriraj Kaushalya as Appu
 Mohan Hettiarachchi as Marshall
 Manel Wanaguru as Rupawathi Meniyo
 Shanudrie Priyasad as Juliet
 Indika Deshapriya as Romeo
 Manike Attanayake
 Ronnie Leitch
 Buddhi Wickrama
 Gayathri Dias as Lisy
 Teddy Vidyalankara
 Nandana Hettiarachchi
 D.B. Gangodathenna

Soundtrack

References

External links
 මිනිස්සුන්ට හිනා ගියත් ලැන්ටිං සිංඤෝ ළඟ මෝඩ ජෝක් නෑ
 එක වගේ දෙන්නෙක් ගැන අපූරු කතාවක්

2015 films
Sinhala-language films